Lipetsk Oblast is a federal subject of Russia (an oblast). Its administrative center is the city of Lipetsk. As of the 2021 Census, its population was 1,143,224.

Geography
Lipetsk Oblast borders with Ryazan Oblast (NE), Tambov Oblast (E), Voronezh Oblast (S), Kursk Oblast (SW), Oryol Oblast (W), and Tula Oblast (NW).

History
According to archaeologists and historians, the territory of the modern Lipetsk Oblast has been inhabited since ancient times. Even before the arrival of the Mongol-Tatar troops, the area had the following settlements: of Elec, Dobrinskaya (now the village of Good) Oaklet (now the village Oaks) (Dankovsky District), Old Fort (Bogorodskoye Dankovsky district) Vorgol (destroyed), Onuza (destroyed), Voronozh (destroyed), Lipetsk (destroyed) and others. During the Mongol invasion of Rus', many fortified cities were destroyed.

At the beginning of the period belonged to the disintegration of the Principality of Chernigov. After 1202, after the fall of Chernigov, Prince Igor Svyatoslavich Yelets arose, Lipetsk and Vorgolskoe fiefdoms. Taking advantage of the weakness of the Principality of Chernigov, Ryazan princes seized all the lands of the upper Don, Voronezh River and annexed them. The newly acquired territories in the south of the Ryazan principality subsequently used the name "Ryazan Ukraine."

The revival of the territory began after the expulsion of the nomads. In a relatively short period of time (end of the 16th and early 17th centuries) were built fortified city: Duncan Talitskii jail, Eletskaya fortress Lebedian. In 1635, construction began on a strong fortified line - Belgorod defense line, which in the Lipetsk region within a modern fortress stood out: Good, Sokolsk and Usman.

Near the plants have populations of workers. One of these settlements was working Lipetsk settlement that gave rise to the city of Lipetsk.

At this time, because of the creation of the Navy and the regular army increased the need for flax, hemp and wool. So begins to actively develop agriculture.

The 18th century saw the continued growth of large land estates. Lipetsk region, with its rich black earth, was the breadbasket of the Russian state. Subsequently, it became widely known as a resort town, mainly because of its mineral waters.

During the February Revolution, the October Revolution of 1917 and the Russian Civil War, the lives of many cultural values, private collections of art and literature, but because of the ensuing repression against the church and the "bourgeois past" seriously affected the architectural ensembles of the estates of the nobility, monasteries and churches.

The modern oblast was formed by the decree of the Presidium of the Supreme Soviet of the USSR on January 6, 1954 from parts of Voronezh, Ryazan, Tambov, Tula and Oryol Oblasts. But 5 years later in 1959 on 12 October Lipetsk was officially declared an official oblast.

Politics

During the Soviet period, the high authority in the oblast was shared between three persons: The first secretary of the Lipetsk CPSU Committee (who in reality had the biggest authority), the chairman of the oblast Soviet (legislative power), and the chairman of the oblast Executive Committee (executive power). Since 1991, CPSU lost all the power, and the head of the Oblast administration, and eventually the governor was appointed/elected alongside elected regional parliament.

The Charter of Lipetsk Oblast is the fundamental law of the region. The Legislative Assembly of Lipetsk Oblast is the province's standing legislative (representative) body. The Legislative Assembly exercises its authority by passing laws, resolutions, and other legal acts and by supervising the implementation and observance of the laws and other legal acts passed by it. The highest executive body is the Oblast Government, which includes territorial executive bodies such as district administrations, committees, and commissions that facilitate development and run the day to day matters of the province. The Oblast administration supports the activities of the Governor who is the highest official, who acts as guarantor of the observance of the oblast Charter in accordance with the Constitution of Russia.

Since 2019, the Governor is Igor Artamonov.

Economy
The most important industrial branches are the iron processing and the mechanical engineering.  The most industrialized cities are Lipetsk, the administrative center, and Yelets. The region's fuel and energy complex is represented by petroleum product marketing companies, a network of consumer gas pipelines, and a power grid.

The largest companies in the region include NLMK (revenues of $ billion in 2017), Cherkizovo Pig Farming ($ million), JSC Progress (baby food manufacturer$,  million), and the local branch of Indesit Company ($ million).

Agriculture
Crop cultivation and horticulture form the basis of the region's agriculture. Livestock farming specializes in cattle, pigs, goats, sheep, and poultry. The processing industry is also well developed.

Administrative divisions

Demographics
Population: 

Ethnic composition (2010):
Russians: 96.3%
Ukrainians: 0.9%
Armenians: 0.6%
Azerbaijanis: 0.3%
Others: 1.9%
45,268 people were registered from administrative databases, and could not declare an ethnicity. It is estimated that the proportion of ethnicities in this group is the same as that of the declared group.

Total fertility rate:
2003 - 1,24  |
2004 - 1,28  |
2005 - 1,27  |
2006 - 1,28  |
2007 - 1,36  |
2008 - 1,43  |
2009 - 1,44  |
2010 - 1,47  |
2011 - 1,47  |
2012 - 1.63  |
2013 - 1.60  |
2014 - 1.66  |
2015 - 1.70  |
2016 - 1.70(e)

Religion

According to a 2012 survey 71.3% of the population of Lipetsk Oblast adheres to the Russian Orthodox Church, 3% are unaffiliated generic Christians, 1% are Muslims, and 1% of the population adheres to the Slavic native faith (Rodnovery) movement. In addition, 15% of the population declares to be "spiritual but not religious", 6% is atheist, and 2.7% follows other religions or did not give an answer to the question.

Attractions

The world's first hyperboloid structure—a steel open-work lattice tower—is located in Polibino, Dankovsky District of Lipetsk Oblast. The hyperboloid tower was built and patented in 1896 by the famous Russian engineer and scientist Vladimir Shukhov. The hyperboloid structures were subsequently built by other architects, such as Antoni Gaudí, Le Corbusier, and Oscar Niemeyer.

References

Notes

Sources

 
States and territories established in 1954
Oblasts of Russia